Febarbamate (INN; Solium, Tymium), also known as phenobamate, is an anxiolytic and tranquilizer of the barbiturate and carbamate families which is used in Europe by itself and as part of a combination drug formulation called tetrabamate.

See also 
 Difebarbamate

References 

Barbiturates
Carbamates
Muscle relaxants
Pyrimidines
Sedatives
GABAA receptor positive allosteric modulators
Anxiolytics